Searsboro in an unincorporated community in Poweshiek County, Iowa, United States. The population was 148 at the 2010 census. The city attempted to disincorporate in 2011, but the move failed when Poweshiek County refused to take control of the city's infrastructure.

Geography
Searsboro is located at  (41.579519, -92.703703).

Demographics

2010 census
As of the census of 2010, there were 148 people, 71 households, and 41 families living in the city. The racial makeup of the city was 99.3% White and 0.7% from two or more races.

There were 71 households, of which 19.7% had children under the age of 18 living with them, 46.5% were married couples living together, 8.5% had a female householder with no husband present, 2.8% had a male householder with no wife present, and 42.3% were non-families. 35.2% of all households were made up of individuals, and 9.8% had someone living alone who was 65 years of age or older. The average household size was 2.08 and the average family size was 2.63.

The median age in the city was 45.3 years. 15.5% of residents were under the age of 18; 7.6% were between the ages of 18 and 24; 26.4% were from 25 to 44; 39.2% were from 45 to 64; and 11.5% were 65 years of age or older. The gender makeup of the city was 51.4% male and 48.6% female.

2000 census
As of the census of 2000, there were 155 people, 70 households, and 39 families living in the city. The racial makeup of the city was 99.35% White and 0.65% Native American.

There were 70 households, out of which 22.9% had children under the age of 18 living with them, 47.1% were married couples living together, 5.7% had a female householder with no husband present, and 42.9% were non-families. 32.9% of all households were made up of individuals, and 14.3% had someone living alone who was 65 years of age or older. The average household size was 2.21 and the average family size was 2.90.

In the city the population was spread out, with 21.9% under the age of 18, 7.1% from 18 to 24, 25.8% from 25 to 44, 25.8% from 45 to 64, and 19.4% who were 65 years of age or older. The median age was 42 years. For every 100 females, there were 101.3 males. For every 100 females age 18 and over, there were 101.7 males.

The median income for a household in the city was $25,795, and the median income for a family was $26,528. Males had a median income of $28,929 versus $27,917 for females. The per capita income for the city was $11,958. About 5.1% of families and 5.2% of the population were below the poverty line, including 8.8% of those under the age of eighteen and 5.9% of those 65 or over.

Education
The Lynnville–Sully Community School District operates local public schools.

Notable people
Searsboro is the hometown of Jeff Criswell, a former offensive lineman for the New York Jets and Kansas City Chiefs.

Franklin Bechly (1873-1965) was born in Searsboro. He became Iowa 6th District Judge, serving from 1927 to 1959.

References

Unincorporated communities in Poweshiek County, Iowa
Unincorporated communities in Iowa